Igor Guilherme Barbosa da Paixão (born 28 June 2000), known as Igor Paixão, is a Brazilian footballer who plays as a forward for Feyenoord.

Club career

Coritiba

Beginnings
Born in Curiaú, a quilombola neighborhood in Macapá, Amapá, Igor Paixão joined Coritiba's youth setup in 2014, after a trial period. On 26 October 2018, he signed his first professional contract with the club.

Igor Paixão was promoted to the first team in January 2019, after playing in the 2019 Copa São Paulo de Futebol Júnior. He made his professional debut on 27 January, coming on as a second-half substitute for Giovanni in a 0–0 Campeonato Paranaense home draw against Toledo. In April 2019, he was demoted back to the under-20 team by new manager Umberto Louzer.

Igor Paixão returned to the first team on 11 June 2019, replacing Juan Alano late into a 1–0 away win over Guarani, in the 2019 Série B. He featured in five further matches in the league, all of them as a substitute, as his side achieved promotion to the Série A.

Loan to Londrina
On 19 January 2020, Igor Paixão was loaned to Série C side Londrina until the end of the season. He scored on his club debut just hours later, netting a last-minute winner in a 2–1 home success over PSTC.

Igor Paixão helped Tubarão in their promotion to the Série B, scoring three goals in the Série C, and returned to his parent club in January 2021.

Breakthrough
Upon returning, Igor Paixão started to feature regularly for Coritiba under manager Gustavo Morínigo, and scored his first goal for the club on 28 March 2021, netting the opener in a 2–1 home win over Cascavel CR. He was also an undisputed starter in the 2021 Série B, scoring seven goals as his side returned to the top tier.

On 7 February 2022, after already scoring four goals in the first five matches of the new campaign, Igor Paixão renewed his contract until the end of 2024. He made his debut in the main category of Brazilian football on 10 April, starting in a 3–0 home win over Goiás.

Igor Paixão scored his first goal in the top tier on 23 April 2022, netting his team's first in a 2–2 draw at Atlético Mineiro.

Feyenoord
On 17 August 2022, Paixão signed a five-year contract with Feyenoord in the Netherlands. On 15 January 2023, he scored his first goal for the club, scoring the first goal in a 3–0 away win over FC Groningen.

Career statistics

Honours
Coritiba
Campeonato Paranaense: 2022

References

External links
Coritiba profile 

2000 births
People from Macapá
Sportspeople from Amapá
Living people
Brazilian footballers
Association football forwards
Coritiba Foot Ball Club players
Londrina Esporte Clube players
Feyenoord players
Campeonato Brasileiro Série A players
Campeonato Brasileiro Série B players
Campeonato Brasileiro Série C players
Brazilian expatriate footballers
Expatriate footballers in the Netherlands
Brazilian expatriate sportspeople in the Netherlands